Bettange-sur-Mess is a small village in the commune of Dippach, in south-western Luxembourg.  , the town has a population of 974.

It is situated on the Mess River, from which its suffix is derived.

Dippach
Towns in Luxembourg